Mount Epomeo (Italian: Monte Epomeo) is the highest mountain on the volcanic island of Ischia, in the Gulf of Naples, Italy. Epomeo is believed to be a volcanic horst.

Much of Epomeo is covered in lush greenery, with a few vineyards also occupying its slopes. Approximately  from the peak the mountain is covered in white lava. 

A path leads to the summit of the mountain from Fontana, one of its quiet traditional villages.

References
Volcanological history of Ischia Island

Epomeo
Epomeo
Ischia
Horsts (geology)
Mountains of Italy under 1000 metres